Carey Stadium is an open-air multi-purpose stadium located just off the boardwalk in Ocean City, New Jersey. The stadium is primarily used by the Ocean City School District for Ocean City High School's football, soccer, and lacrosse teams.

Carey Stadium is also known as the home field for the Ocean City Nor'easters (formerly named Ocean City Barons) of the USL League Two. The club has called the stadium home since 2005. In 2016, the stadium's natural grass field was replaced with a new FieldTurf surface made of all-natural cork fill instead of crumb rubber. The stadium's nickname "The Beach House" was coined during the Nor'easters' 2005 season by the team's play-by-play announcer Josh Hakala. Since joining USL League Two in 2003, the Nor'easters have had the fourth-best home record of any team in the league.

Carey Stadium is located a little more than 200 meters from the Atlantic Ocean, only one minor league sports team in the country plays closer to an ocean than the Nor'easters do. (Minor league baseball team Pensacola Blue Wahoos play at Admiral Fetterman Field in Pensacola, Florida)

External links 
Ocean City Nor'easters
Ocean City High School

References

Ocean City, New Jersey
High school football venues in the United States
Lacrosse venues in the United States
Soccer venues in New Jersey
Buildings and structures in Cape May County, New Jersey
American football venues in New Jersey